David Percy Jones (July 6, 1860 – August 3, 1927) was a banker and Republican politician who served as the 21st and 23rd mayor of Minneapolis.

Life and career
Jones was born in Minneapolis, Minnesota to Edwin S. Jones and Harriet M. James. His father was a lawyer and judge who had founded the Hennepin County Savings Bank and a mortgage investment firm. Jones attended Minneapolis Public Schools and the University of Minnesota, graduating in 1883 and working in his father's investment firm thereafter. In 1898, Jones was elected to the Minneapolis City Council; he served as the council's president beginning in 1900. When mayor A. A. Ames fled the city in 1902 to avoid prosecution for corruption, Jones became the city's acting mayor and enacted a series of reforms to rein in the liquor, gambling and prostitution businesses which had proliferated under Ames. While he did not stand for re-election in the fall of 1902, he ran again in 1904 and won a second term where he continued his reforms. He was defeated in his bid for re-election in 1906.

Jones died in 1926.

Electoral history
Minneapolis Mayoral Election, 1904
David Percy Jones 18,445
James C. Haynes 18,189		
Milton K. Rogers 2,682		
Charles M. Way 777		
Benjamin Adolphus Frankford 296		
Minneapolis Mayoral Election, 1906
James C. Haynes 21,778
David Percy Jones 18,213		
Milton K. Rogers 1,002

References

1860 births
1927 deaths
Mayors of Minneapolis
University of Minnesota alumni
Businesspeople from Minneapolis
Minnesota Republicans
Minneapolis City Council members